Heather Laurie Holden (born December 17, 1969) is a Canadian-American actress, producer, and human rights activist, known for her roles as Marita Covarrubias in The X-Files (1996–2002), Adele Stanton in The Majestic (2001), Cybil Bennett in Silent Hill (2006), Amanda Dumfries in The Mist (2007), Olivia Murray in The Shield (2008), Andrea Harrison in The Walking Dead (2010–2013, 2020-2022), Renee in The Americans (20172018), and the Crimson Countess in Vought News Network: Seven on 7 with Cameron Coleman (2021) and The Boys (2022).

Early life 
Born in Los Angeles and raised in Toronto, Holden holds dual citizenship in the United States and Canada. After her parents, actors Glen Corbett and Adrienne Ellis, divorced, her mother married director Michael Anderson. Laurie then split her time between Los Angeles and Toronto. 

Holden received her first film role when she was a young child. While her stepfather was directing The Martian Chronicles, she visited him on the set. A child actress hired to play Rock Hudson's daughter never arrived, so Laurie filled in for her. As a teenager, she won the Look of the Year modeling contest in Toronto and was given a minor role as a babysitter in Anderson's comedy Separate Vacations (1986).

After graduating from the Bishop Strachan School, Holden attended McGill University, where she studied economics and political science. She transferred to University of California, Los Angeles and received a degree in theater and film in 1993. At UCLA, she was a member of the National Honor Society and received the Natalie Wood Acting Award. Holden then pursued a master's degree in human rights at Columbia University.

Career 

Early in her career, Holden made a name for herself by co-starring opposite Burt Reynolds in Physical Evidence (1989), Vanessa Redgrave in Young Catherine (1991), and William Shatner in the TV Movie TekWar: TekLab (1994). She also played Mabel Dunham in the TV Movie The Pathfinder (1996) (based on the novel of James Fenimore Cooper). Onstage, she starred in Time and the Conways, written by J. B. Priestley, and The Winter's Tale, based on the play by William Shakespeare. Other stage roles include Regina in Ghosts and Procne in The Love of the Nightingale. After making various guest appearances on Due South, Murder, She Wrote, and Poltergeist: The Legacy (when she played a dual role), Holden found some success playing a recurring role on the seminal sci-fi series The X-Files:  Marita Covarrubias, a mysterious government worker who becomes an informant to Special Agent Fox Mulder, from seasons four through nine (1996–2002). She also had a supporting role, as Mary Travis, opposite Michael Biehn and Ron Perlman, in the CBS TV series based on the MGM classic, The Magnificent Seven (1998–2000) and a role as Debra Campbell on Highlander: The Series.

Some of Holden's most notable roles include starring opposite Jim Carrey in Frank Darabont's film The Majestic (2001) (It was while performing on stage in Cat on a Hot Tin Roof, that Holden was discovered by Darabont). As Carrey's long lost love, she received critical acclaim for her performance. She also co-starred alongside Dean Cain, Jennifer Tilly, and Tim Curry in the Canadian comedy Bailey's Billion$. Other movie roles have included those of Michael Chiklis' character's former love interest in Fantastic Four (2005), Cybil Bennett in Christophe Gans' artistic-horror video game adaptation of Silent Hill (2006), Amanda Dumfries in The Mist (2007), and Olivia Murray in The Shield.

From 2010 to 2013, she played the role of Andrea, a civil rights attorney and survivor of a global zombie plague in The Walking Dead, an AMC television horror drama series.
In 2013, she worked on the movie Honeytrap as an executive producer.
In 2014 she played the role of Ann McGinnis in the third season of Major Crimes. Also in 2014, she co-starred in the movie Dumb and Dumber To, opposite Jim Carrey, Jeff Daniels and Kathleen Turner. She played Adele Pinchelow, the main antagonist of the Farrelly brothers comedy.

In 2015, she appeared as Dr. Hannah Tramble, an ER surgeon, in the third season of Chicago Fire. It was announced Holden would reprise her role as Dr. Tramble in a planned spinoff, Chicago Med. Holden was set to co-star opposite Epatha Merkerson and Yaya Dacosta in the ensemble medical drama. The series is being conceived and written by Chicago Fire creators/executive producers Derek Haas and Michael Brandt. However, she dropped out of the project for "family reasons".

In 2016, she appeared in The Abolitionists, a documentary film by Darrin Fletcher. In 2017, Holden joins the cast of The Americans in the fifth season, when she plays Renee. She was cast in indie thriller Pyewacket, a movie directed by Adam MacDonald.

In 2018, Laurie Holden appeared in the crime thriller Dragged Across Concrete, starring Mel Gibson  and Vince Vaughn.

Holden joined the cast of American legal drama television series Proven Innocent  (which premiered in 2019 on Fox), where she plays Greta Bellows.

In 2022, she joins The Boys season 3, in the role of Crimson Countess, while also performing the songs "America's Son" and "Chimps Don't Cry".

Charity work and human rights activism 
Holden is a supporter of women's rights, racial justice, and actively campaigns against sex trafficking.

Holden is a founding board member of the Canadian Somaly Mam Foundation, which campaigns against human trafficking, and an advisory board member of the Somaly Mam Foundation in the U.S.

In 2014, Holden worked with Operation Underground Railroad, a volunteer organization that aims to hunt down and arrest child sex traffickers. The group aided authorities in Cartagena, Colombia, in arresting five sex-traffickers and rescuing underage girls.

Filmography

Film

Television

Video game

Online

Theatre 
The Only Game in Town (2000), based on the play by Frank D. Gilroy
Cat on a Hot Tin Roof (2000), based on the play by Tennessee Williams
The Love of the Nightingale, based on the play Procne by Timberlake Wertenbaker
Ghosts, based on the play Regina by Henrik Ibsen
Toros Y Hevos
A Chorus Line, based on the book Kristine by James Kirkwood, Jr. and Nicholas Dante
The Winter's Tale, based on the play Hermione by William Shakespeare
Time and the Conways, based on the play Madge by J. B. Priestley

Awards and nominations 
Holden was named as one of the top 100 Most Creative People in Hollywood in Entertainment Weekly'''s It List and One of Ten Actors to Watch by Variety. She also won "The Look of The Year" Elite model search in Toronto and was nominated in 1996 for a Gemini Award for Best Performance by an Actress in a Guest Role in a Dramatic Series for Due South (1994). Laurie is named as one of "Ten Actors To Watch" by Variety in 2002.

She was nominated in 2011 for a Saturn Award for Best Supporting Actress in Television for the series The Walking Dead. For her role in this series, she was also nominated in 2011 for the Scream Award for Best Supporting Actress.

In 2013, Laurie Holden won the Saturn Award for Best Supporting Actress for her work on The Walking Dead''.

References

External links 

20th-century American actresses
21st-century American actresses
Actresses from Los Angeles
Actresses from Toronto
American film actresses
American television actresses
American voice actresses
Columbia University alumni
Living people
McGill University alumni
UCLA Film School alumni
American Shakespearean actresses
American human rights activists
Women human rights activists
American stage actresses
Anti–human trafficking activists
American film producers
American women film producers
1969 births